Launton railway station served the village of Launton in Oxfordshire. It was on the Varsity Line between Bletchley and Oxford. The station opened in 1850; British Railways closed Launton station, and withdrew passenger services at the end of 1967.

Routes

References

Disused railway stations in Oxfordshire
Former London and North Western Railway stations
Railway stations in Great Britain opened in 1852
Railway stations in Great Britain closed in 1968
Beeching closures in England
1852 establishments in England
1968 disestablishments in England